The 1986 Bulgarian Cup Final was the 46th final of the Bulgarian Cup, and was contested between Levski Sofia and CSKA Sofia on 27 April 1986 at Vasil Levski National Stadium in Sofia. Levski won the final 2–1.

Match

Details

See also
1985–86 A Group

References

Bulgarian Cup finals
PFC CSKA Sofia matches
PFC Levski Sofia matches
Cup Final